

Men's events

Freestyle

Greco-Roman

Medal table

Events at the 1999 Pan American Games
Pan American Games
1999
International wrestling competitions hosted by Canada